I'll See You in My Dreams is a 1951 musical film starring Doris Day and Danny Thomas, directed by Michael Curtiz.

The film is a biography of lyricist Gus Kahn, and includes a number of songs written by Kahn, including the title song. The story, which thoroughly suppresses Kahn's Jewish origins, is told from the point of view of Kahn's wife Grace, who was still alive when the film was made (Kahn died some ten years earlier). I'll See You in My Dreams was a big hit, Warner Brothers' second-highest-grossing film of 1951. Warner Brothers re-teamed Curtiz and Thomas in another project: the 25th-anniversary remake of the first talking film, The Jazz Singer (1927), with Thomas in the Al Jolson role, The Jazz Singer.

Plot summary

Gus Kahn (Danny Thomas) is the prolific tunesmith, whose fortunes take an upswing in 1908 when he meets and falls in love with Grace LeBoy (Doris Day). Kahn's career ascends to spectacular heights via such hits as "Pretty Baby", "My Buddy", "Toot, Toot, Tootsie", and "Makin' Whoopee", only to go into eclipse when he loses his savings in the 1929 stock-market crash.

Cast
 Doris Day as Grace LeBoy Kahn
 Danny Thomas as Gus Kahn 
 Frank Lovejoy as Walter Donaldson
 Patrice Wymore as Gloria Knight (singing voice was dubbed by Bonnie Lou Williams)
 James Gleason as Fred Thompson
 Mary Wickes as Anna
 Julie Oshins as Johnny Martin
 Jim Backus as Sam Harris
 Minna Gombell as Mrs. LeBoy
 Harry Antrim as Mr. LeBoy
 William Forrest as Florenz Ziegfeld, Jr.
 Bunny Lewbel as Irene, at age 6
 Robert Lyden as Donald, at age 8
 Mimi Gibson as Irene, at age 3
 Christopher Olsen as Donald, at age 4 (as Christy Olson)
 Joan Vohs as Chorine (uncredited)

Notes
An album of the same name was released by Columbia Records, containing songs sung by Day (some of them duets with Thomas) in the film.

The film has been cited by Berry Gordy as an inspiration for his start in songwriting.

References

External links
 
 
 
 
 Synopsis on Reel.com 
 Synopsis on Doris Day's film site

1951 films
1950s biographical films
1951 musical comedy films
American biographical films
American musical comedy films
Biographical films about musicians
American black-and-white films
1950s English-language films
Films about composers
Films directed by Michael Curtiz
Warner Bros. films
Cultural depictions of classical musicians
1950s American films